Aristovo is a rural locality (a village) in Ramenskoye Rural Settlement, Sheksninsky District, Vologda Oblast, Russia. The population was 39 as of 2002.

Geography 
Aristovo is located 43 km north of Sheksna (the district's administrative centre) by road. Ramenye is the nearest rural locality.

References 

Rural localities in Sheksninsky District